David Kennedy (born 29 September 1969) is a British civil servant and economist, Chief Executive of the British government's Committee on Climate Change from 2008 until 2014, now director general for economic development at the Department for International Development.

Life
The son of Peter Kennedy and Anne Kennedy, he was educated at the University of Sheffield, where he gained a BA degree in Economics and Econometrics, then at the University of Manchester, graduating MA in Economics, and finally at the London School of Economics where he took a PhD for research in Economics in 1995. His doctoral thesis was titled The economics of London bus tendering.

Kennedy was a research fellow at the London School of Economics from 1993 to 1996, then briefly a consultant at the Centre for Regulated Industries in 1996–1997, before joining the European Bank for Reconstruction and Development as a Senior Economist. In 2003 he moved to the World Bank, where he remained until 2006. In 2008 he was appointed as Chief Executive of the Committee on Climate Change. In May 2014 it was announced that he was leaving to take on a new role, and that the committee's chief economist, Adrian Gault, would act as interim chief executive until a substantive appointment had been made. Lord Deben commented that "He is the best kind of civil servant; intellectually robust and technically proficient, bringing sound judgment and careful evaluation to every issue. We owe him a great debt for a job well done." Kennedy commented that he was leaving with a good deal of sadness. In June 2014 he took up a new appointment as first director general for economic development at the Department for International Development.

Private life
In 2001, Kennedy married Philippa Stonebridge, and they have one daughter, two sons and a cat called Blu. In Who's Who he gives his recreations as "kids, classical clarinet, jazz saxophone, literature, Manchester City".

Selected publications
Building a Low-carbon Economy, 2008, with Adair Turner
Meeting Carbon Budgets: the need for a step change, 2009
many articles on energy, infrastructure, and climate change

Notes

1969 births
Living people
Alumni of the University of Sheffield
Alumni of the University of Manchester
Alumni of the London School of Economics
British economists